Seronera is a small settlement in Serengeti National Park, Tanzania. It is home to a small airstrip.

Populated places in Mara Region